The Rivière-Chézine old forest is an exceptional forest ecosystems of Quebec located in Saint-Gabriel-de-Valcartier, in La Jacques-Cartier Regional County Municipality, in administrative region of Capitale-Nationale, in the  province of Quebec, Canada. It is located in zec Batiscan-Neilson.

Toponymy 
The Rivière-Chézine old forest takes its name from the Chézine River (Sainte-Anne River), which borders it on the northeast side. The name of the watercourse, of unknown origin, was noted in 1945.

Geography 
The forest is located in a mountainous region interspersed with deep valleys with steep slopes. The forest itself is located on an escarpment exposed to the east with medium to steep slopes. The soil, usually till is deep, well-drained soil. The forest is bordered to the northeast by the Chézine river.

The forest is located in zec Batiscan-Neilson.

Flora 
The old forest of Rivière-Chézine is a forest mainly dominated by the yellow birch (Betula alleghaniensis). Since it is a species susceptible to water stress, oblique drainage probably favored its growth. The forest also has many characteristics of old-growth forest, such as an irregular structure, woody debris on the ground, chicot s and trees with imposing diameters.

The shrub layer, we especially observe the maple with ears of corn (Acer spicatum ), which is accompanied by the viburnum antlers (Viburnum lantanoides) elderberry (Sambucus racemosa), Balsam fir (Abies balsamea) and gadellier lacustre (Ribes lacustre). The herbaceous layer is occupied by ferns of the genus Dryopteris sp., The beech beetle (Phegopteris connectilis), the mountain oxalid (Oxalis montana) and pubescent bramble (Rubus pubescens).

Notes and references

Appendices

Related articles 
 Chézine River (Sainte-Anne River)
 Zec Batiscan-Neilson

External links

Bibliography 
.

Exceptional forest ecosystems of Quebec
Protected areas of Capitale-Nationale
Protected areas established in 2007
La Jacques-Cartier Regional County Municipality